Kardo Nyigyor is an Indian politician belonging to People's Party of Arunachal. He is a legislator of the Arunachal Pradesh Legislative Assembly.

Political life
Nyigyor was elected as a legislator of the Arunachal Pradesh Legislative Assembly in 2017 bypoll as a Bharatiya Janata Party candidate from Likabali. He joined People's Party of Arunachal in 2019. He was elected again as a member of the Arunachal Pradesh Legislative Assembly from Likabali in 2019.

References

Living people
People's Party of Arunachal politicians
Bharatiya Janata Party politicians from Arunachal Pradesh
Year of birth missing (living people)
Arunachal Pradesh MLAs 2014–2019
Arunachal Pradesh MLAs 2019–2024